Cross County School District #7 is a school district headquartered in unincorporated Cross County, Arkansas, with a Cherry Valley mailing address. It includes the municipalities of Cherry Valley and Hickory Ridge, and the unincorporated area of Vanndale.

It was established in 1965 by the merger of the Cherry Valley, Hickory Ridge, and Vanndale school districts.

Schools 
 Cross County High School
 Cross County Elementary School

 Former schools
 Cherry Valley Elementary School
 Hickory Ridge Elementary School
 Vanndale Elementary School

References

Further reading
  (Download) - Includes boundaries of the predecessor districts

External links
 

School districts in Arkansas
Education in Cross County, Arkansas
1965 establishments in Arkansas
School districts established in 1965